Zabukovje nad Sevnico is a dispersed settlement in the hills north of Sevnica in central Slovenia. The area is part of the historical region of Styria. The Municipality of Sevnica is now included in the Lower Sava Statistical Region.

Name
The name of the settlement was changed from Zabukovje to Zabukovje nad Sevnico in 1953.

Church
The local parish church is dedicated to Saint Leonard and belongs to the Roman Catholic Diocese of Celje. It dates to the 17th century.

Notable people
Notable people that were born or lived in Zabukovje nad Sevnico include:
, nom de guerre Marok (1911–1944), officer, National Hero of Yugoslavia
Janez Zorko (born 1937), sculptor and mountain climber

References

External links
Zabukovje nad Sevnico at Geopedia

Populated places in the Municipality of Sevnica